Anna Seidel (born 31 March 1998) is a German short track speed skater. At the ISU World Cup in Kolomna, Russia, in November 2013, Seidel placed 6th in the A Final of the 1500m event, thereby qualifying for the 2014 Winter Olympics in Sochi, where she was the only lady represented Germany in short track. She was officially nominated by the DOSB (German Olympic Committee) on December 18, 2013.

Anna Seidel started her sport carrier in athletics. At the age of 9, she started her first short track practice, and in the year 2007, she took part in her first junior competition. She got more success within the following years and ranked 3rd at Europe Cup in March 2013.
She finished 40th (of 67) at the Junior World Championship 2013 in Warsaw, which allowed her to be qualified to Short Track World Cup.
Following sport achievements brought Anna Seidel to 2014 Olympic Games where she showed her personal best time in 1500m — 2:20.405min.

In December 2013, Anna Seidel became an official nominee to join the German Olympic movement and the second youngest member of German Olympic Team after Gianina Ernst.

References

External links 
 

1998 births
Living people
German female short track speed skaters
Olympic short track speed skaters of Germany
Sportspeople from Dresden
Short track speed skaters at the 2014 Winter Olympics
Short track speed skaters at the 2018 Winter Olympics
Short track speed skaters at the 2022 Winter Olympics
Short track speed skaters at the 2016 Winter Youth Olympics
21st-century German women
Competitors at the 2023 Winter World University Games
Universiade medalists in short track speed skating
Universiade silver medalists for Germany